Xanthophryne koynayensis (common names: Humbali Village toad, chrome-yellow toad, Koyna toad) is a species of toad in the family Bufonidae. It is endemic to the Western Ghats of India where it is known from Koyna (including Koyna Wildlife Sanctuary) in the Maharashtra state. Formerly included in the genus Bufo it has been since made the type species for the genus Xanthophryne and is a sister species of Xanthophryne tigerina.

History
Xanthophryne koynayensis has been described twice using the same materials collected in connection with the Koyna Hydroelectric Project: first as Bufo koynayensis by Soman in 1963, and then as Bufo sulphureus by Grandison and Daniel in 1964.

Description
Xanthophryne koynayensis are relatively small toads: adult males measure  in snout–vent length. The body is covered by small warts with black tips and dark brown in colour; there are yellow patches on the flanks, thighs, and shoulders. The tympanum is indistinct.

Habitat and conservation
Xanthophryne koynayensis is a rare species. Its natural habitats are moist to wet evergreen forest and dry riparian grassland. It is threatened by habitat loss caused by agriculture and clear cutting of forests.

References

koynayensis
Frogs of India
Endemic fauna of the Western Ghats
Taxonomy articles created by Polbot
Amphibians described in 1963